The Orange County Courthouse is located at 801 West Division Avenue, Orange, Texas, United States.  The art deco courthouse was designed by Charles Henry Page of the firm C. H. Page and Brother  of Austin, Texas and built in 1937 after a fire destroyed the Old Orange County Courthouse.

See also

List of county courthouses in Texas

References

External links
"Orange County Courthouse photographs".

Government buildings completed in 1937
Art Deco architecture in Texas
Art Deco courthouses
Buildings and structures in Orange County, Texas
County courthouses in Texas